Queensferry may refer to several places:

North Queensferry, Fife, Scotland
South Queensferry, Edinburgh, Scotland
Queensferry (Parliament of Scotland constituency)
Queensferry, Flintshire, Wales
Queensferry, Victoria, Australia

See also
Queensferry Crossing, a road bridge over the Firth of Forth